Chuck Adams was the defending champion, but lost in the quarterfinals this year.

Jeremy Bates won the title, defeating Jörn Renzenbrink 6–4, 6–7(6–8), 6–3 in the final.

Seeds

Draw

Finals

Top half

Bottom half

References

 Main draw

1994 Singles
1994 ATP Tour
1994 Seoul Open